Sarobetsu may refer to:
Sarobetsu Plain in Rishiri-Rebun-Sarobetsu National Park, Japan
Sarobetsu River in Hokkaidō, Japan
Sarobetsu (train), a train service in Hokkaidō, Japan